Admiral Sushil Kumar Isaac, PVSM, UYSM, AVSM, NM (died 27 November 2019)  was an Indian Navy Admiral who served as Chief of Naval Staff of the Indian Navy. A native of Neyyoor (Nagercoil), he ceased to use his surname of Isaac because it caused confusion with his brother, who shares the same initials and is also a naval officer.

Naval career
A specialist in hydrography and amphibious warfare, Kumar was also a qualified air warfare instructor. He was an alumnus of the National Defence College and was an instructor at the Defence Services Staff College, Wellington. His training abroad included a deputation to the Royal Navy on board  in 1963 and a course in amphibious warfare with the US Navy at Coronado, California, in 1976. He participated in the 1961 invasion of Goa and in both the Indo-Pakistan wars of 1965 and 1971. He was awarded the Nao Sena Medal for gallantry whilst in command of INS Ghorpad.

Kumar was promoted to substantive commander on 1 January 1977 and to captain on 1 January 1983. As Director of Naval Operations, he was decorated with the Uttam Yudh Seva Medal for his exceptional conduct in Operation Pawan and in Operation Cactus (Liberation of Maldives).

Flag rank
He was promoted to substantive rear admiral on 6 July 1990. 
Kumar held operational commands and important posts such as the Vice Chief of Naval Staff, the Flag Officer Maharashtra Area (FOMA), Commander of the Flotilla in Mumbai and Fortress Commander, Andaman & Nicobar Islands (FORTAN). He was the Flag Officer Commanding-in-Chief Southern Naval Command in Kochi, before being appointed the Chief of Naval Staff. Sushil Kumar assumed charge of the Indian Navy, as the 16th Chief of Naval Staff, on 30 December 1998.  During his tenure as CNS, He was the highest-decorated serving officer in the Indian Navy, and he retired on 29 December 2001. He was a keen yachtsman and played polo on the international circuit, for which he had an international rating of 4+ goals.

Death 
Kumar died on 27 November 2019 at the Indian Army Research and Referral Hospital, Delhi at the age of 79. Prime Minister Narendra Modi expressed his condolences upon this.

Awards and decorations

References

Chiefs of the Naval Staff (India)
Vice Chiefs of Naval Staff (India)
Indian Navy admirals
People from Kanyakumari district
2019 deaths
Recipients of the Param Vishisht Seva Medal
Year of birth missing
Chiefs of Personnel (India)
National Defence College, India alumni
Recipients of the Uttam Yudh Seva Medal
Recipients of the Ati Vishisht Seva Medal
Recipients of the Nau Sena Medal
Academic staff of the Defence Services Staff College